Cok is a surname. Notable people with the surname include:

John Cok (fl. 1420), English politician
Ronald S. Cok (born 1959), American scientist, engineer, and inventor

See also
Lucija Čok

English-language surnames